The Southern Pacific Railroad Depot in Yuma, Arizona, was built as a  Spanish Colonial Revival-style station by the Southern Pacific Railroad in 1926.

After Southern Pacific Railroad ceased passenger operations upon Amtrak's start in 1971, the station housed the Yuma Fine Arts Museum.  The depot was listed in the National Register of Historic Places in 1976.  The structure was razed in the summer of 1994 after a devastating fire damaged the building in the spring of 1993.  It was delisted from the National Register in 2019.

Amtrak passengers are now served at the Yuma Amtrak station which consists of two open platforms and a tunnel.

See also
 List of historic properties in Yuma, Arizona 
 Southern Pacific Freight Depot (Yuma, Arizona) – also NRHP listed.
 Southern Pacific Railroad Passenger Coach Car-S.P. X7 – also NRHP listed.
 National Register of Historic Places listings in Yuma County, Arizona

References

Former Southern Pacific Railroad stations
Buildings and structures in Yuma, Arizona
Railway stations on the National Register of Historic Places in Arizona
Railway stations in the United States opened in 1926
Spanish Colonial Revival architecture in Arizona
National Register of Historic Places in Yuma County, Arizona
Former National Register of Historic Places in Arizona
Former railway stations in Arizona